Melissa Pritchard (née Brown) is an American short story writer, novelist, essayist, and journalist.

Life
Melissa Brown was born on December 12, 1948 in San Mateo, California. She grew up in San Mateo, Burlingame and Menlo Park and attended the Convent of the Sacred Heart High School in Atherton, California. Her parents are Clarence John Brown, Jr., and Helen Lorraine Reilly Brown; she has one sibling, Penny Lee Byrd. She graduated in 1970 from the University of California, Santa Barbara, with a B.A. in Comparative Religions and in 1995, received an M.F.A. from Vermont College. Her first marriage of five years was to Daniel Hachez, musician and luthier, her second of eleven years to Mark Pritchard, father of her two daughters, Noelle Katarina Pritchard (b. 1977) and Caitlin Skye Pritchard (b. 1982). She began to write fiction in Evanston, Illinois, and her first book, Spirit Seizures, published by the University of Georgia Press in 1987, received the Flannery O’Connor Award and the Carl Sandburg Award. Stories from that collection received an O. Henry Prize Stories Award (“A Private Landscape,”) the James D. Phelan Award and an honorary citation from the PEN/Nelson Algren Award. She raised her daughters in Evanston, Illinois, Taos, New Mexico and Tempe, Arizona, where she currently teaches at Arizona State University.

Awards and honors
 1980, 1981, 1983, 1986, 1988 Illinois Arts Council Awards for Fiction
 1982 National Endowment for the Arts Fellowship
 1982 James D. Phelan Award, San Francisco Foundation, judge Robert Pinsky
 1984 Prize Stories: The O.Henry Awards, “A Private Landscape”
 1987 Flannery O'Connor Award for Short Fiction, Spirit Seizures
 1987 New York Times Notable Book of the Year, Spirit Seizures
 1987 PEN/Nelson Algren Award, honorary citation, finalist, judge Stanley Elkin
 1988 Carl Sandburg Literary Award, Spirit Seizures
 1988 D.H. Lawrence Fellowship, finalist
 1988 Great Lakes Colleges New Writers Award, finalist
 1991 The Best of the West, “Hallie: How Love is Found, When the Heart is Lost”
 1995 The Claudia Ortese Memorial Lecture Prize, University of Florence, Italy
 1995 New York Times Editor’s Choice, The Instinct for Bliss
 1996 PEN/West Award Finalist, The Instinct for Bliss
 1996 The Janet Heidinger Kafka Prize, University of Rochester, The Instinct for Bliss
 1996 The Pushcart Prize, “The Instinct for Bliss”
 1998 Barnes and Noble Discover Great New Writers Award for Selene of the Spirits
 1998 Howard Foundation Fellowship, Brown University
 2000 Prize Stories: The O. Henry Award, “Salve Regina”
 2001 The Pushcart Prize, “Funktionslust”
 2002 NPR Summer Reading List, Disappearing Ingenue
 2004 Best Books of 2004, Chicago Tribune, Late Bloomer
 2004 Southwestern Books of the Year, Late Bloomer
 2007 Spirit of Mater Award, first annual alumna award, Sacred Heart Preparatory Academy (formerly Convent of the Sacred Heart)
 2008 Hawthornden International Fellowship, Midlothian, Scotland
 2010 Advisory Board Member, Afghan Women's Writing Project and Founder, The Ashton Goodman Fund
 2011 Bogliasco International Fellowship, Liguria, Italy
 2011 Faculty Achievement Award for Defining Edge Research in Performance and Art Works, Arizona State University
 2012 Fondation Ledig-Rowohlt Fellowship, Lavigny/Lausanne, Switzerland
 2013 Founders' Day Faculty Teaching Award, Arizona State University
 2014 Virginia G. Piper Center for Creative Writing Faculty Development Grant
 2014 The Atlantic Journalism Award, “100 Fantastic Pieces of Journalism,” for “Still, God Helps You: Memories of a Sudanese Child Slave”
 2014 Finalist, Katherine Schneider Journalism Award for Excellence in Reporting on a Disability, for “Still God Helps You: Memories of a Sudanese Child Slave"

Works

Novels
 Phoenix (NY: Cane Hill Press, 1991). 
 Selene of the Spirits (NJ: Ontario Review Press, 1998), Barnes and Noble Discover Great Writers Award, 1998. 
 Late Bloomer (NY: Doubleday, 2004), starred review, Publishers Weekly; Best Books of 2004, Chicago Tribune; Southwestern Books of the Year, 2004; "Best of 2004," Florida Sun Sentinel. 
 Palmerino (NY: Bellevue Literary Press, 2014).

Short Story Collections
 Spirit Seizures (GA: University of Georgia Press, 1987), The Flannery O’Connor and Carl Sandburg Awards, New York Times Notable Book. . Re-published in paperback, University of Georgia Press, 2011
 The Instinct for Bliss  (MA: Zoland Books, 1995), The Janet Heidinger Kafka Prize, New York Times Editor’s Choice. 
 Disappearing Ingenue: The Misadventures of Eleanor Stoddard (NY: Doubleday, 2002), NPR Annual Summer Reading List Selection, 2002.  
 The Odditorium (NY: Bellevue Literary Press, 2012), O, The Oprah Magazine “Title to Pick Up Now” & Oprah.com Book of the Week, San Francisco Chronicle Best Book of the Year, Library Journal Best Stories Collection of the Year.

Biography
 Devotedly Virginia: The Life of Virginia Galvin Piper (AZ: Piper Charitable Trust, 2008)

Essay Collection
 A Solemn Pleasure: The Art of the Essay (NY: Bellevue Literary Press, May 2015)

Literary Journal
 The American Story: Best of Story Quarterly, co-editors Diane Williams and Anne Brashler (NY: Cane Hill Press, 1990)

Select Essays
 “The Lost Boys: From Sudan to Phoenix,” feature article, MetroAZ Magazine, Leigh Flayton, editor, Summer 2004
 “A Solemn Pleasure,” Conjunctions Magazine 51, David Shields, editor, Fall 2008
 “A Women’s Garden, Sown in Blood,” The Collagist, Matt Bell, editor, November 2009
 “Finding Ashton, A Soldier’s Story,” O, The Oprah Magazine, Tenth Anniversary Issue, May 2010
 “My, Dachshund, My Dear,” O, The Oprah Magazine, July 2011
 “Doxology,” The Gettysburg Review, Peter Stitt, editor, 2012
 "Still God Helps You: Memories of a Sudanese Child Slave," The Wilson Quarterly, July 2013

Select Anthologies (as contributor)
 “A Private Landscape,” Prize Stories: The O.Henry Awards, William Abrahams, editor (NY: Random House, 1984)
 “Hallie,” Best of the West 4 (NY: W.W. Norton, 1991)
 “Spirit Seizures,” The Literary Ghost: Great Contemporary Ghost Stories, Larry Dark, editor, (NY: Atlantic Monthly Press, 1991)
 “La Bete,” The Flannery O’Connor Award: Selected Stories, Charles East, editor (GA: University of Georgia Press, 1992)
 “A Graven Space,” The Faraway Nearby: Georgia O'Keeffe as Icon, Radcliffe Biography Series, Christopher Merrill and Ellen Bradbury, editors (MA: Addison Wesley Publishing, 1992)
 “El Ojito del Muerto,” Walking the Twilight, Women Writers of the Southwest (AZ: Northland Publishing, 1994)
 “The Instinct for Bliss,” Pushcart Prize XX, Bill Henderson, editor (NY: Pushcart Press), 1995. 
 “Eating for Theodora,” Walking the Twilight II, Women Writers of the Southwest (AZ: Northland Publishing, 1996)
 “The Instinct for Bliss,” Mothers: Twenty Stories of Contemporary Motherhood, Katrina Kenison, editor (NY: Farrar Straus and Giroux, 1996, paperback 1997). 
 “Spirit Seizures,” American Gothic Tales, Joyce Carol Oates, editor (NY: Dutton Signet, 1996)
 “Salve Regina,” Prize Stories: The O.Henry Awards, Larry Dark, editor (NY: Random House, 2000)
 “The Instinct for Bliss,” The Prentice Hall Anthology of Women’s Literature (NY: Prentice Hall, 2000)
 “Funktionslust,” Pushcart Prize XXVI, Larry Henderson, editor (NY: Pushcart Press, 2002)
 “Desirelessness,” Desire: Women Write about Wanting, Lisa Solod, editor (NY: Seal Press, 2007)
 “A Solemn Pleasure,” The Inevitable, Contemporary Writers Confront Death, Bradford Morrow and David Shields, editors (NY: W.W. Norton, 2010)

In Translation
Spirit Seizures:
 Ataques Espirituales (Barcelona, Spain: Alcor, 1990)
 Un Paesaggio Solo Mio (Rome, Italy: Theoria, 1992)
“Sweet Feed”:
 “Nutrimento Prezioso,” Da Costa a Costa: 12 racconti americani di oggi, editor Mario Materassi (Bari, Italy: Palomar Press, 2004)
Phoenix:
 Phoenix, La Vigna Nascosta series, Mario Materassi, editor (Bari, Italy: Palomar Press, 2007)

Select Keynotes
 “From Vision to Re-vision,” Santa Fe Writer’s Conference, Santa Fe, New Mexico, 1992
 “The Ethics of Fiction,” The Claudia Ortese Memorial Lecture, University of Florence, Florence, Italy, 1995
 “In the Spirit of Mater,” Alumna Award speech, Sacred Heart Preparatory Academy (formerly Convent of the Sacred Heart,) Atherton, California, 2007
 “The Oblivion of Beauty: Women in Panjshir Province, Afghanistan,” Prague Summer Writers Program, Prague, Czech Republic, 2010 
 “The Rose: A Hero’s Journey,” Commandant’s Speaker Series, Air Force Institute of Technology, Dayton, Ohio, 2010
 “The Contemporary American Writer: Curator, Witness, Diviner,” Annual Interdisciplinary Seminar on American Studies, Centro di Studi Americani, Rome, Italy, 2011
 “Violet del Palmerino” Seminar, L’Associazione Culturale Il Palmerino, British Institute of Florence, the French Institute of Florence, and Villa il Palmerino, Florence, Italy, 2012
 “The Rose: A Hero’s Journey,” Women in Leadership: Unlocking the Power of Women to Change the World, Womanity Summit, Tempe, Arizona, 2013

Humanitarian Work and Related Awards
 Workshop Leader, The Daywalka Foundation, Kalam:MarginsWrite poetry workshops with adolescents rescued from human trafficking, Calcutta, India, 2006, 2007, 2009
 “Spirit of Mater” first annual alumna award, Sacred Heart Preparatory School, Atherton, California, (formerly Convent of the Sacred Heart) 2007
 Director, Outreach Project, MFA program, Arizona State University, Phoenix Children’s Hospital, Phoenix, Arizona, 2008
 Mission Participant, Women for World Health, Cuenca Military Hospital, service award from Rotary International, Cuenca, Ecuador, 2008 
 Workshop Leader, STOP, poetry and art workshop with adolescents rescued from human trafficking, Delhi, India, 2009
 Advisory Board Member, The Afghan Women’s Writing Project, 2010–present 
 Founder, The Ashton Goodman Fund, The Afghan Women’s Writing Project, 2010
 “In My Dreams,” sex trafficking public awareness presentation and choral performance by mezzo-soprano Melissa Walker Glenn, PhD, Orangewood Presbyterian Church, Phoenix, Arizona, February 2011
 Director, “Out of Silence,” staged reading of Afghan women’s writing by ASU MFA students, Project Humanities, Tempe, Arizona, May 2011
 Faculty Achievement Award for Defining Edge Research in Performance and Art Works, Arizona State University, 2011
 Founders' Day Faculty Teaching Award, Arizona State University, 2012

References

External links
Video from 2013 Womanity Summit Keynote, Tempe, Arizona
Author's website
“The Mystery from which Everything Arises: An Interview with Melissa Pritchard,” The Southeast Review 29:1 (2 July 2011), Marian Crotty
"Afghan women’s voices brought ‘Out of Silence,’” Arizona State University News (11 April 2011), Judith Smith
"Meeting Ashton--A Symphony Worth Sharing," Air Force Print News Today (14 December 2010), by Laura McGowan
"A Web Exclusive Interview with Melissa Pritchard", Image Journal (March 2009)
"Mission trip illustrates power of women," Arizona State University News (11 December 2008), Judith Smith
"Interview with Melissa Pritchard", Piper Bulletin (December 2008)
“Bookworm,” nationally syndicated book review show, KCRW Radio, 89.9 FM, Los Angeles, CA (13 May 2004), Michael Silverblatt, reviewer/host

American short story writers
Brown University alumni
Vermont College of Fine Arts alumni
Arizona State University faculty
Living people
People from San Mateo, California
Year of birth missing (living people)